The Maryland county executive elections of 2018 took place on November 6, 2018, with the primary election occurring on June 26, 2018.

Anne Arundel County, Baltimore County, Frederick County, Harford County, Howard County, Montgomery County, Prince George's County, and Wicomico County elected county executives.

Anne Arundel County

Candidates

Republican
Steve Schuh, incumbent County Executive and former Maryland State Delegate.

Democratic
Steuart Pittman, president of the Maryland Horse Council and owner of Dodon Farm

Results

Baltimore County
Incumbent Baltimore County Executive Kevin B. Kamenetz is prevented from seeking a third term due to term limits, creating an open seat. 
Kamenetz died on May 10, 2018, making County Administrative Officer Fred Homan acting County Executive. Homan is not running for election.

Candidates

Democratic
Vicki Almond, Baltimore County Councilwoman
James Brochin, state senator
Kevin Francis Marron, Parkville resident
John A. Olszewski Jr., former state delegate

Results

Recount

The Democratic Party result was in dispute and runner-up Jim Brochin has requested a recount, which commenced on July 12, 2018. On election night, Olszewski finished ahead of Brochin by 350 votes. After absentee ballots were counted, Olszewski finished ahead of Brochin by 9 votes, out of roughly 84,500 cast.  Vicki Almond finished third by roughly 1,000 votes. Olszewski ended up winning the recount by 17 votes.

Republican
Pat McDonough, state delegate
Al Redmer, State Insurance Commissioner

Results

General Election

Results

Frederick County

Candidates

Democratic
 Jan Gardner, incumbent Frederick County Executive, former Frederick County Commissioner

Republican
 Kathy Afzali, state delegate
 Kirby Delauter, Frederick County Council Member
 Regina Williams, former Budget Officer of Frederick County

Results

Harford County

Candidates

Republican
Barry Glassman, incumbent County Executive, former Maryland State Senator and former Maryland State Delegate
Mike Perrone Jr.

Democratic
Maryann Connaghan Forgan

Results

Howard County

Candidates

Democratic
Calvin Ball III, incumbent Howard County Councilman
Harry Dunbar

Republican
Allan H. Kittleman, incumbent County Executive (2014–present)

Montgomery County
Isiah "Ike" Leggett, incumbent county executive, former Montgomery County Councilman and former chairman of the Maryland Democratic Party is not eligible for reelection.

Candidates

Democratic
 Roger Berliner, Montgomery County Council chair (Potomac-Bethesda)
 David Blair, businessman 
 Marc Elrich, Montgomery County Council member (at large)
 Rose Krasnow, former mayor of Rockville; deputy director of planning, Montgomery County 
 George L. Leventhal, Montgomery County Council member (at large)
 William C. Frick, Maryland House Majority Leader (District 16)

Republican
 Robin Ficker, activist and attorney

Unaffiliated
Nancy Floreen, Montgomery County Council Member (At Large)

Primary election results

General election results

Prince George's County
The current County Executive, Democrat Rushern Baker, was precluded from seeking a third term by term limits.

Candidates

Democratic
 Angela Alsobrooks, Prince George's County State's Attorney
 Donna Edwards, former Maryland Rep.
 Paul Monteiro, former Obama Administration official and director of AmeriCorps VISTA
 C. Anthony Muse, Maryland state senator
 Samuel Bogley, former Maryland Lt. Governor
 Billy Bridges
 Lewis Johnson
 Michael Kennedy
 Tommie Thompson

Republican
Jerry J. Mathis

Primary election results

General election results

Republican primary winner Jerry J. Mathis withdrew from the race before the general election and his name did not appear on the ballot.

Wicomico County

Candidates

Democratic
John William Hamilton, former republican candidate for Wicomico County Council, district 3, in 2010.

Republican
Bob Culver, incumbent County Executive since 2014.

Independent
Jack Heath, current City of Salisbury council president.

General election results

References

County executives
Maryland county executives